Events from the year 1899 in China.

Incumbents
Guangxu Emperor

Events
October 18 - Battle of Senluo Temple, a clash between members of the "Militia United in Righteousness" (義和團) better known as the "Boxers") and Qing government troops that took place on October 18, 1899, near a temple located on the western edge of Pingyuan County in northwestern Shandong.

Births
January 29 - Qu Qiubai
August 21 - Fang Zhimin
November 18 - Li Lisan

 
1890s in China
Years of the 19th century in China